Ahmet Yıldırım  (born 25 February 1974 in Amasya) is a Turkish former professional footballer and coach who is currently the manager of Sarıyer.

Club career
Yıldırım has played for Fenerbahçe S.K., Samsunspor, Ankaragücü, İstanbulspor A.Ş., Galatasaray S.K.,  Beşiktaş J.K. and Ankaraspor in the Turkish Süper Lig.

International career
Yıldırım appeared in four matches for the senior Turkey national football team, his debut was a second-half substitute in a friendly against Ukraine on 12 February 2003. He also appeared in one match at the 2003 FIFA Confederations Cup.

Honours
Galatasaray
 Süper Lig: 1999–2000
 Turkish Cup: 1999–2000
 UEFA Cup: 1999–2000
 UEFA Super Cup: 2000

Beşiktaş
 Süper Lig: 2002–03

Turkey
 FIFA Confederations Cup 2003: Third place

References

External links
 Ahmet Yildirim at Footballdatabase
 

1974 births
Living people
Turkish footballers
Turkey international footballers
Turkey B international footballers
2003 FIFA Confederations Cup players
Adanaspor footballers
Malatyaspor footballers
Ankaraspor footballers
Beşiktaş J.K. footballers
Galatasaray S.K. footballers
İstanbulspor footballers
MKE Ankaragücü footballers
Samsunspor footballers
Fenerbahçe S.K. footballers
Süper Lig players
People from Amasya
Turkey under-21 international footballers
Members of the 25th Parliament of Turkey
Members of the 26th Parliament of Turkey
UEFA Cup winning players
Association football defenders